KDWY is an American FM radio station broadcasting on 105.3 MHz FM and is licensed to Diamondville, Wyoming. It primarily broadcasts a country music format, but occasionally broadcasts local high school football and basketball games from Kemmerer or Diamondville as well. KDWY has a sister station, KMER 940 AM.

Signal
KDWY broadcasts from a tower located northeast of Kemmerer, and with its 16,000 watt signal, covers much of southwestern Wyoming. KDWY can also be heard in parts of northern Utah and southeastern Idaho, with a good radio, or a car stereo.
The station at one point had a construction permit to move to Oakley, Utah, changing frequencies to 105.5 FM. It would have then become a rimshot to the Salt Lake City market. The tower would move to Humpy Peak in Utah.
This construction permit is no longer listed in the FCC database.

References

External links

DWY
Radio stations established in 2001
Country radio stations in the United States
Lincoln County, Wyoming
2001 establishments in Wyoming